Raavu Gopala Rao (14 January 1937 – 13 August 1994) was an Indian actor and producer known for his works in Telugu cinema and Telugu theatre. In a film career spanning more than twenty five years, Rao starred in over four hundred feature films in a variety of characters. Rao was known for his gruesome portrayals of antagonist roles with a touch of humour. Rao was presented with Kala Prapoorna in 1990 by Andhra University and was honored with "Natavirat" and "Chittoor Nagayya Award" in 1987.

Rao was known for his villainous roles in works such as Mutyala Muggu (1975), Bhakta Kannappa (1976), Gorantha Deepam (1978), Manavoori Pandavulu (1978), Kaliyuga Ravanasurudu (1980), Tyagayya (1981), Ooruki Monagadu (1981), Gudachari No.1 (1983), Abhilasha (1983), Khaidi (1983), Challenge (1984), Jaakii (1985), Bullet (1985), Athaku Yamudu Ammayiki Mogudu (1989), Lorry Driver (1990), Kondaveeti Donga (1990), and Gang Leader (1991).

Early life
He started his career in theatre, with his own company, Associated Amateur Drama Company and did many plays under the banner. S. V. Ranga Rao saw his plays and recommended him to Gutta Ramineedu, who was making Bhakta Potana (1966). He worked as an assistant director for this film. He served as an assistant director in other films, including Bangaru Sankellu and Mooga Prema.

Politics
He was appointed to the Andhra Pradesh Legislative Council in 1984-85 and Indian Parliament by N. T. Rama Rao, the then chief minister of Andhra Pradesh. He was a member of Rajya Sabha from 3 April 1986 until 2 April 1992.

Death
He died on 13 August 1994, aged 57. The film Prema & Co was released after his death. His son, Rao Ramesh, is a Telugu film actor.

Selected filmography

References

External links
 

1937 births
1994 deaths
Telugu male actors
Telugu comedians
Indian male stage actors
Indian male film actors
Telugu film producers
Rajya Sabha members from Andhra Pradesh
Andhra Pradesh MLAs 1983–1985
Place of death missing
People from Kakinada
Male actors from Andhra Pradesh
20th-century Indian male actors
Indian actor-politicians
Telugu Desam Party politicians
Telugu politicians
Film producers from Andhra Pradesh
20th-century comedians